Bharadvajasana (IAST: Bharadvājāsana) or Bharadvaja's twist is a twisting asana in modern yoga as exercise.

Etymology and origins 

The asana is dedicated to the sage Bharadvāja who was one of the Seven Great Sages or Rishi. He was the father of Drona, a master of military arts and the royal guru to Kauravas, Pandavas and the Devastras, the princes who fought the great war of the Mahabharata.

A different asana is illustrated under the name Bharadvajasana in the 19th century Sritattvanidhi; it somewhat resembles Mayurasana with the legs in Padmasana, but as drawn it would be impossible to perform.

The pose currently known by the name Bharadvajasana is a modern one, first seen in the 20th century. It is described in the works of two of Krishnamacharya's pupils, B. K. S. Iyengar's 1966 Light on Yoga and Pattabhi Jois's Ashtanga Vinyasa Yoga.

Description 

Bharadvājāsana is a seated spinal twist. Bharadvajasana I is the basic form, with the legs as in Virasana (hero pose), one foot on the floor and the other ankle cradled in the arch of the foot below. Baddha Konasana and Marichyasana can be used to prepare for Bharadvajasana. Utthita trikonasana, extended triangle pose, is a suitable counter pose to Bharadvajasana.

Variations 

Bharadvajasana II is an advanced form requiring high hip mobility; one leg is bent as in Padmasana (lotus position), while the other leg is bent as in Virasana.

Bharadvajasana on chair is a variant performed sitting sideways on an armless chair. This does not require hip mobility; the arms grasp the back of the chair to assist with the twist.

See also 

 Marichyasana, a sitting twist with one leg straight
 Matsyendrasana, a sitting twist with one knee up

References

Sources

 
 
 
 
 

Sitting asanas
Twisting asanas
Hip-opening asanas
Asymmetric asanas